John Myles, also known as John Miles, (c. 1621–1683) was the founder of Swansea, Massachusetts, and the founder of the earliest recorded Baptist churches in Wales (UK) and Massachusetts (US).

John Myles was born in Wales around 1621 and was educated at Brasenose College at Oxford University. He then went to London where he visited the Glasshouse church, an early Particular Baptist (Reformed Baptist) congregation. Myles then returned to Ilston in Wales, where he served as a minister from 1649 to 1662 and he served as a "tryer" for ministers under Oliver Cromwell's government. After the restoration of the monarchy and requirement for all ministers to adhere to the Book of Common Prayer, Myles left England for the Plymouth Colony in the 1660s. Myles took the historic Ilston Book to North America with him, and it is now located at Brown University in Providence, Rhode Island. In America Myles worked with the Congregationalist state church in Rehoboth before his group was told to leave the town for its Baptist views, and Myles and his congregation (largely from Ilston, Wales) then founded the town of Swansea and First Baptist Church in Swansea. Swansea was named after a town in their homeland in Wales. Myles served as pastor for twenty years. During King Philip's War, Myles pastored the First Baptist Church in Boston while fleeing from the Indians.

References

17th-century Baptist ministers from the United States
17th-century Welsh Baptist ministers
People of colonial Massachusetts
Welsh emigrants to the United States
Massachusetts colonial-era clergy
People from Swansea, Massachusetts